Jonathan Bourne  (1811–1889) was a New Bedford alderman, major investor in the whaling business, member of executive councils of Massachusetts governors George D. Robinson and Oliver Ames, and namesake of the town of Bourne.

References

1811 births
1889 deaths
Bourne, Massachusetts
19th-century American businesspeople